Riccardo Targetti (born 15 April 1952) is an Italian former freestyle swimmer. He competed in two events at the 1972 Summer Olympics.

References

External links
 

1952 births
Living people
Italian male freestyle swimmers
Olympic swimmers of Italy
Swimmers at the 1972 Summer Olympics
Swimmers from Milan
Mediterranean Games gold medalists for Italy
Mediterranean Games medalists in swimming
Swimmers at the 1971 Mediterranean Games